Charles Henderson Ross (23 July 1864 – 23 November 1919) was a Scottish businessman. He was the tai-pan of the Jardine, Matheson & Co. and member of the Legislative Council of Hong Kong.

Biography
Ross was born on 23 July 1864. He was the son of Captain Horatio Ross of Rossie and Christian Henderson, who died 1892, daughter of Charles P. Henderson of Whittington Hall, Lancashire. He spent many years in the East, first in India and later in Tsientsin and Shanghai. He volunteered during the Boxer Rebellion in Tsientsin under the command of General Alfred Gaselee, the commander of the British troops sent to the relief of Peking, and was awarded the Boxer medal with two bars. He also served in the Shanghai light horse and was the head of the old Hongkong mounted troop.

Ross joined the Jardine, Matheson & Co., the then biggest trading firm in the Far East. He moved to Hong Kong in 1910 was appointed by Henry Keswick as his substitute for all the purposes set out in a power of attorney of 5 September 1912. He was also member of the Legislative Council of Hong Kong during Henry Keswick on leave from 1911 to 1913.

He was a Director of the Hongkong and Shanghai Bank and the Peak Tramways, Chairman of the Whampoa Dock Co. and the Hongkong and Kowloon Wharf Co., member of the Green Island Cement Co., Chairman of the Land Investment Agency and a Director of the Land Reclamation and the West Point Building Companies. He was particularly interested in various sugar, cotton, ice, insurance, and machinery companies for which Jardine Matheson were agents.

He helped founding the Hong Kong Scouts Company and took in charge of the training of the Scouts in the New Territories. He was also a Steward of the Hong Kong Jockey Club. He had acted as treasurer of the Coronation Fund, was prominently connected with the Horticultural Society's exhibition and donated a ground for a tennis court to the Y.M.C.A. at East Point.

Ross left Hong Kong in 1913 by the SS Siberia as Manager of Jardine Matheson's company in London appointed by Henry Keswick on 30 September 1914. He also represented Hong Kong to the Imperial Council of Commerce in 1916.

Ross died 23 November 1919 in London, leaving estate of the value of £78,000. He married Eveline Isabel Bernard, daughter of Edmund Bowen Bernard and Arabella Margaret Piercy in 1910.

References

1864 births
1919 deaths
Scottish expatriates in China
Scottish expatriates in Hong Kong
Scottish expatriates in India
Hong Kong businesspeople
HSBC people
CK Hutchison Holdings
Jardine Matheson Group
Members of the Legislative Council of Hong Kong
Peak Tram
The Wharf (Holdings)
19th-century Scottish businesspeople